Arrow Lakes Provincial Park is a provincial park in British Columbia, Canada.

Park
The park was established May 8, 1981. The primary role of the park is to maintain a tourism travel route and local outdoor recreation opportunities.

Lakes

The Columbia River widens to form Upper Arrow Lake and Lower Arrow Lake between the Selkirk Mountains to the east and the Monashee Mountains to the west.

References

External links

Provincial parks of British Columbia
Arrow Lakes
1981 establishments in British Columbia
Protected areas established in 1981